Paisley is both an English and Scottish surname and a given name derived from the surname. The name is rising in popularity in English speaking countries such as the United States, where it has ranked among the top 1,000 names for newborn girls since 2006 and has ranked among the top 50 names for girls in recent years. It is a name that is notably more commonly used by whites in rural states in the United States than in urban areas. Spelling variants are also well-used.   

Notable people named Paisley include:

Given name
Paisley Currah, Canadian transgender academic
Paisley Wu (born 1971), Hong Kong singer and television presenter

Surname
Bob Paisley, English football manager
Brad Paisley (born 1972), American country singer
Chris Paisley (born 1986), English professional golfer
David Paisley (born 1979), Scottish actor
Doug Paisley, Canadian folk singer
Eileen Paisley, Baroness Paisley of St George's (born 1931), Northern Ireland politician
Grégory Paisley (born 1977), French footballer
Ian Paisley (1926–2014), Northern Ireland politician and church leader 
Ian Paisley Jr (born 1966), Northern Ireland politician, son of Ian Paisley
Jackie Paisley, American female bodybuilder
Janet Paisley (1948–2018), Scottish writer, poet and playwright
John Paisley (actor), Scottish actor working in China
John Paisley (CIA officer), former CIA officer
Kimberly Williams-Paisley (born 1971), American actress
Michelle Paisley (born 1968), American author
Rebecca Paisley, American author
Rhonda Paisley (born 1960), Northern Ireland author and politician
Stephen Paisley (born 1983), Irish professional football player
Una Paisley (1922-1977), Australian cricket player

Stage names
 Paisley (wrestler), Sharmell Sullivan-Huffman, American professional wrestler performing as "Paisley"

Notes

See also
Peisley
Peasley

Unisex given names

fr:Paisley